Rédah Atassi (born 16 March 1991) is a Moroccan professional footballer who plays for Al Urooba a centre-back.

Professional career
A youth product of Toulouse FC since the age of 8, Atassi was captain of their reserve side in 2011. He began his career with brief spells with Getafe CF B and Fath Union Sport from 2011 to 2013.

Atassi joined AS Béziers when they were in the Championnat de France amateur, and helped them with successive promotions to the professional Ligue 2 in 2018. He made his professional debut with Béziers in a 2–0 Ligue 2 win over AS Nancy on 27 July 2018.

International career
Atassi was born in France, and is of Moroccan descent. He represented the Morocco U20s in various friendlies in 2011 and the 2012 Toulon Tournament.

References

External links
 
 Mountakhab Profile
 
 

1991 births
Living people
Sportspeople from Agen
Association football defenders
Moroccan footballers
Morocco youth international footballers
French footballers
French sportspeople of Moroccan descent
AS Béziers (2007) players
Fath Union Sport players
Getafe CF B players
Hassania Agadir players
Al-Adalah FC players
Al Urooba Club players
Ligue 2 players
Championnat National players
Championnat National 2 players
Segunda División B players
Saudi First Division League players
UAE Pro League players
Moroccan expatriate footballers
Moroccan expatriate sportspeople in Spain
French expatriate footballers
French expatriate sportspeople in Spain
Expatriate footballers in Spain
Expatriate footballers in Saudi Arabia
Moroccan expatriate sportspeople in Saudi Arabia
Expatriate footballers in the United Arab Emirates
Moroccan expatriate sportspeople in the United Arab Emirates
Footballers from Nouvelle-Aquitaine